Sergei Ulagay (1875/1877 – April 29, 1944?) was a White Army general in the Russian Civil War of 1917–1922. He was a veteran of the Russo-Japanese War (1904–1905) and of World War I (1914–1917). He was a recipient (1917) of the Order of St. George. 

General Ulagay allegedly took part in Ahmet Zogu's coup in Albania in December 1924.

He died in Marseille, France. He is buried at Sainte-Geneviève-des-Bois Russian Cemetery south of Paris.

References

Bibliography
 Рутыч Н. Биографический справочник высших чинов Добровольческой армии и Вооруженных сил Юга России. Moscow, 1997.
 
 Bratishka by Igor SOFRONOV

External links
 Улагаевский десант 1920 А. М. Агеев БСЭ (цитаты).
 Белая гвардия: последний приют Владимир Лобыцын
 Сергей Георгиевич Улагай
 Сергей Георгиевич Улагай
 Сергей Георгиевич Улагай А. Б. Езеев, С. В. Карпенко
 Казачий словарь-справочник (Калифорния, 1950-е): Улагай Сергей Григорьевич
 Казачий словарь-справочник (Калифорния, 1950-е): Улагай Кучук Касполетович
 Ташкентский историк, потомок белогвардейского генерала написал книгу о династии Романовых 26.02.2006 Сид Янышев. (Использованы материалы члена-корреспондента Российской академии наук Я. Н. Щапова, научного сотрудника Института военной истории А. И. Дерябина и заведующего отделом Артиллерийского музея П. К. Корнакова)

1870s births
1944 deaths
Burials at Sainte-Geneviève-des-Bois Russian Cemetery
White movement generals
People of the Russo-Japanese War
Kuban Cossacks
Russian military personnel of World War I